Amrapali Jewels, is a jewellery house founded in 1978 by Rajiv Arora and Rajesh Ajmera in Jaipur. Amrapali designs, produces and distributes tribal, fine and uncut gemstone jewellery. The brand has stores in India and London. The brand also operates a museum of Indian jewellery in Jaipur.

Historical background
The inspiration to start Amrapali Jewellery was the fascination that Rajiv Arora and Rajesh Ajmera held for ancient India, as it was the focus of their graduate studies.

Indian Jewellery Museum
The brand operates an Amrapali Museum of Jewellery, spread over a  space and showcasing traditional Indian Jewellery in the city of Jaipur. The collection took 50 years to be gathered.

Income Tax Raid
On 13 July 2020, the I.T. Department raided Amrapali Jewels and its owner Rajiv Arora, who is a close aide of Congress CM, Ashok Gehlot and Vice President of the Rajasthan Pradesh Congress Committee for tax evasion at various locations, including Mumbai and Delhi.
There was also a case in 2015 registered against Amrapali Jewels regarding bogus purchases of precious and semi precious stones.

References

Jewellery companies of India
Companies based in Rajasthan
Indian jewellers
Jewellery retailers of India
Economy of Jaipur
Indian brands
Indian companies established in 1978
1978 establishments in Rajasthan